Josiah White (1781–1850) was a Pennsylvania industrialist and key figure in the American Industrial Revolution.

Career
White began early factory-centered mill production in 1808 in water powered ironworks near Philadelphia, along with his partner, Erskine Hazard, when they quickly found that their first mill at the East Falls, Pennsylvania to be much too small. Subsequently, they built a more elaborate and larger mill nearby to refine pig iron and produce cast iron artifacts and roll wrought bar iron goods, including nails and wire. The pair were especially influential after 1814 in helping make the American Industrial Revolution accelerate its building momentum by agitating for infrastructure investment, sponsoring two key river navigations and the nation's first long railway, and then after initial success, increasingly supplying an expanding part of the country's overall energy needs including that of other industrialists at a time when there occurred the prolonged first energy crisis in the brief history of the country — where forests had grown remote from population centers through over logging, charcoal and imported coal were increasing in price rapidly, and fire wood was growing dearly expensive.

White was a mill owner, and early pioneer in the advancement of civil engineering, mining, iron production, water transport. and railroad development, boat and barge shipping & construction.  An innovative open-minded pragmatist, most of all in response to the energy crises in the early 19th century, his focus from 1815 on was mostly about the mining, and delivery of anthracite coal to others for their manufacturing and domestic heating needs in everyday life. Having taken over an 1808 speculative charter to build locks and mill races along the Schuylkill River's falls, which today is the shoreline along the East Falls region of Philadelphia. Historican Charles V. Hagner wrote that, "Erskine Hazard was the partner of Josiah, White in the iron and wire business; in the, erection of the locks and mill-seats he had, another partner, Joseph Gillingham. They finished the locks and canal on the western side of, the river and two mills were built there — one a sawmill, the other for making white lead."  These were in addition to the two main mills of White and Hazard, which were on the east or left bank.

During the War of 1812, he directed the effort to find a way to ignite and burn effectively anthracite coal, and succeeded. This alone would give him a place in history, but that was but a start. Along with his partner, Erskine Hazard, he also helped found numerous companies, most either mining operations or transportation enterprises opened to establish a better transportation infrastructure for transport of this coal, people, and other industrial materials needs such as ores, timber, and finished goods in the Schuylkill Valley, the Lehigh Valley, the Delaware Valley, and Wyoming Valley regions. Having commissioned anthracite shipment by mule train from up the Schuylkill, in 1815 White and Hazard started the Lehigh Canal machinations as commissioners, but were not selected by investors to become the operations managers elected to work out ways and means. Subsequently, the managers selected a slow plodding approach with which the partners quarreled, championing instead a means to deliver coal down river much more quickly using temporary dams and artificial freshets in order to produce revenue from one way traffic delivering coal. This method was rejected by the managers, resulting in the belated first deliveries of coal on the Schuylkill Canal only in 1823, while their method delivered record amount of 365 long-tons of anthracite coal down the Lehigh Canal to Philadelphia in December 1820, four years ahead of promises.  Their Lehigh Coal and Navigation Companies are credited with being the earliest known example of vertical integration, the companies each sourcing at least part of the needs of the next domino in the chain.

His innovations reached into finished goods as well, having learned how to burn anthracite for industrial iron processing, he experimented with a succession of fireplace and furnace grates until he created artifacts allowing use of the stone coal to replace expensive fire wood for heating.  In 1818 White's wire works built the first (temporary) wire suspension bridge  over the Falls of the Schuylkill using trees and tall buildings near the river to string catenary cables from which a board walk was suspended attached by wires.  Ever looking for better ways in the 1820s he and Hazard experimented with blast furnace production of smelted pig iron using charges of anthracite in Mauch Chunk (today's Jim Thorpe, Pennsylvania), and succeeded in part, perhaps as much as any in America, for their processes could not always reliably repeat, so were not commercially viable in the long run.  This primed them to import skills and necessary equipment when news of successful use of anthracite pig iron processes arrived from Wales in 1838; subsequently he invested heavily and had, as the operating manager, had the Lehigh Coal & Navigation Company invest in the Lehigh Crane Iron Company backing the importing of professional talent from Wales to establish the first sustainably-successful blast furnaces of the region in Catasauqua, and established the first wire rope (steel cable) factory in the United States in Mauch Chunk, which enabled Ashley Planes and up cable railway conversion and expansion of Mauch Chunk Switchback Railway.

Lehigh Coal Company and Lehigh Navigation Company

In 1814, White and Hazard obtained the last two punts the Lehigh Coal Mine Company (LCMC) had managed to pole down river to Philadelphia, having lost more boats than reached the safety of the docks, the bitter fruits of over a years work by the working party sent out the year before to build boats and mine coal to fill them. They soon learned the LCMC was not intending to send out other expeditions, being of a mind they'd lost sufficient money, so White and Hazard felt the companies rights could be leased and set out to examine Lehigh's course, and tour the mine site along Pisgah Ridge to examine why both mining and delivery of coal was supposedly so difficult. They concluded the surface outcrops at the mine located in what today is Summit Hill, Pennsylvania would be easy to mine with the proper digging tools capable of breaking the hard mineral. Examination of the mountainous terrain back towards the Lehigh, they conceived a wagon road which descended steadily to a point above the river, so loading of boats could be done by chute. Lastly, they concluded the necessary river depth could be achieved for a safe down descent by employing a quasi-lock gate that sprang to mind as he examined the situations. In the event, they returned home filled with enthusiasm convinced that good management could achieve a regular supply of coal to customers in Philadelphia. In short order they obtained an option on leasing the mining and other rights held by the despondent owners of the LCMC, and began activities promoting the venture.

Erskine Hazard-founding partners of the Lehigh Coal Company, the Lehigh Navigation Company, Ashley Planes, the Lehigh Canal,  Lehigh and Susquehanna Railroad, Lehigh Coal & Navigation Company, Mauch Chunk Switchback Railway, and the Lehigh and Susquehanna Railroad.

Other companies

This is a list of other enterprises histories mention Josiah White backed, or had a hand in supporting:
 Beaver Meadow Railroad and Coal Company. Beaver Meadow began producing coal in 1813, using ground transportation. The mining and railroad operation began producing volumes of coal in 1833, employing the first steam locomotives in the Lehigh Valley.

Notes

References

Footnotes

Places on National Register of Historic Places
A number of White's works, including several separated sections of the Lehigh Canal are individually listed on the National Register of Historic Places (NRHP).

NRHP-listed works of Josiah White include:
Carbon County Section of the Lehigh Canal, along the Lehigh River Weissport and vicinity, NRHP-listed
Lehigh Canal, Lehigh Gap to S Walnutport boundary Walnutport, Pennsylvania, NRHP-listed
Lehigh Canal: Eastern Section Glendon and Abbott Street Industrial Sites, Lehigh River from Hopeville to confluence of Lehigh and Delaware Rivers, Easton, Pennsylvania, NRHP-listed
Lehigh Canal: Allentown to Hopeville Section, along the Lehigh River, Allentown and Bethlehem, Pennsylvania, NRHP-listed 
Mauch Chunk and Summit Hill Switchback Railroad, between Ludlow St. in Summit Hill and F.A.P. 209 in Jim Thorpe, NRHP-listed

External links

Josiah White papers at Tricollege Libraries

1781 births
1850 deaths
19th-century American businesspeople
19th-century American inventors
American businesspeople in the coal industry
American canal engineers
American railway entrepreneurs
Businesspeople from Philadelphia
Chief executives in the manufacturing industry
Engineers from Pennsylvania